Sang Bumi Ruwa Jurai (English: one land, two kinds) is the provincial anthem of Lampung, Indonesia. Its title also serves as the provincial motto. 

Written by Syaiful Anwar, the song's lyrics talk of the unity between the Pesisir and Pepadun peoples of Lampung.

Lyrics 

Lampung